Martyna Łukasik (born ) is a Polish volleyball player. She is part of the Poland women's national volleyball team.

She participated in the  2017 FIVB Volleyball Women's U20 World Championship, 2018 Montreux Volley Masters,  and 2018 FIVB Volleyball Women's Nations League.
On club level she played for KPS Chemik Police.

Her older sister Justyna is also a volleyball player.

References

External links 
 CEV profile
 FIVB profile

1996 births
Living people
Polish women's volleyball players
Sportspeople from Gdańsk